The following is a comprehensive list of acting and directing credits for American actress Angela Bassett.

Actress

Film

Television

Theatre

Video games

Director

Producer

See also
List of awards and nominations received by Angela Bassett

References

Actress filmographies
American filmographies